Carlos González Juárez (born 7 April 1986) is a Spanish football manager who serves as head coach of Canadian club Atlético Ottawa.

Early life
González was born in Granada. After giving up on his career as a player, he studied sport science at Alfonso X El Sabio University and the University of Granada, which he credited with helping launch his career as a football manager.

Managerial career

Málaga
In 2012, González began working as a coach at the academy of La Liga side Málaga.

Atlético Madrid
In 2015, he left Málaga to coach in Atlético Madrid's academy system. In 2018, he became manager of the under-19 team and led them to the final of the 2019 Copa del Rey Juvenil, where the team lost to Villarreal.

Kuwait
On 24 February 2021, González moved to Kuwait to sign as manager of Kuwait SC, his first position as a club first-team manager, and simultaneously as manager of the Kuwaiti national under-23 team. He left Kuwait SC in July of that year, but continued as Kuwait U23 coach at the 2022 U-23 Asian Cup qualifying tournament, guiding Kuwait to qualification for the final tournament. In November 2021, González was appointed manager of the Kuwaiti senior national team, where he coached the team in friendlies against the Czech Republic and Lithuania that month, and a pair of friendlies against Libya in early 2022.

Atlético Ottawa
On 24 February 2022, González signed as head coach of Atlético Madrid-owned Canadian Premier League side Atlético Ottawa. On October 28, 2022, after leading the club to first place in the CPL regular season, he was named CPL Coach of the Year.

Honours

Atlético Ottawa 
 Canadian Premier League
Regular Season: 2022
CPL Coach of the Year: 2022

Managerial statistics

References

1986 births
Living people
Spanish football managers
Sportspeople from Granada
Spanish expatriate football managers
Expatriate football managers in Kuwait
Spanish expatriate sportspeople in Kuwait
Expatriate soccer managers in Canada
Spanish expatriate sportspeople in Canada
Málaga CF non-playing staff
Atlético Madrid non-playing staff
Kuwait SC managers
Kuwait national football team managers
Atlético Ottawa non-playing staff
Canadian Premier League coaches